Gülümbe (formerly: Çamkoru) is a village in the Bilecik District, Bilecik Province, Turkey. Its population is 580 (2021).

References

Villages in Bilecik District